Maurice René Fréchet (1878–1973) was a French mathematician.

Fréchet may also refer to:


People
 Jean Fréchet (born 1944), American chemist and academic
 René-Arthur Fréchet (1879–1950), Canadian architect

Places
 Le Fréchet a commune in Haute-Garonne, France
 Fréchet-Aure, a commune in Hautes-Pyrénées, France
 Fréchou-Fréchet, a commune in Hautes-Pyrénées, France

Other uses
 21537 Fréchet, a minor planet

See also
 Cazaux-Fréchet-Anéran-Camors, Hautes-Pyrénées, France
 Frechette (disambiguation)